Ebden may refer to:

 Ebden, Victoria, Australia
 Ebden railway station
 Charles Ebden (1811–1867), Australian pastoralist and politician
 Charles Ebden (cricketer) (1880–1949), English cricketer
 John Bardwell Ebden (1787–1873), businessman and politician of the Cape Colony, South Africa
 Matthew Ebden (born 1987), Australian professional tennis player

See also
 Hebden (disambiguation)
 Major Ebden Memorial Cricket Tournament, Visakhapatnam, Andhra Pradesh, India